New Rochelle may refer to:

 New Rochelle, New York State, USA; a city in Westchester County
 New Rochelle station (Amtrak code: NRO), New Rochelle, Westchester, NYS, USA; a train station, serving Metro North commuter line and Amtrak intercity service
 New Rochelle Mall, New Rochelle, Westchester, NYS, USA; a shopping center
 City School District of New Rochelle, New Rochelle, Westchester, NYS, USA; a public schools school district
 College of New Rochelle, New Rochelle, Westchester, NYS, USA; a private Catholic college
 New Rochelle High School (NRHS), New Rochelle, Westchester, NYS, USA

See also

 New Rochelle Walk of Fame, New Rochelle, Westchester, NYS, USA
 New Rochelle Handicap (horseracing)
 
 
 Rochelle (disambiguation)
 New (disambiguation)